

Awards

FIBA European Champions Cup Finals Top Scorer
 Antonello Riva ( Ford Cantù)

References

External links
FIBA European League 1982–83

1982–83 in European basketball
1983–84
1983 in Swiss sport
1982–83 in Italian basketball
International basketball competitions hosted by Switzerland